Sheung Yau Tin Tsuen is a village in the Shap Pat Heung area of Yuen Long District, Hong Kong.

Administration
Sheung Yau Tin Tsuen is a recognized village under the New Territories Small House Policy. For district councils electoral purposes, Sheung Yau Tin Tsuen was part of the Shap Pat Heung Central constituency in 2019.

See also
 Ha Yau Tin Tsuen

References

External links

 Delineation of area of existing village Sheung Yau Tin (Shap Pat Heung) for election of resident representative (2019 to 2022)

Villages in Yuen Long District, Hong Kong
Shap Pat Heung